"Dance Hall Days" is a song by English new wave band Wang Chung. It was originally released as a single in 1982 when the band was called Huang Chung, then it was re-recorded and re-released a year later in 1983 for the studio album Points on the Curve. It was the band's only single to make the top 40 charts in the UK, narrowly missing the top 20. In the US, it peaked at No. 16 on the Billboard Hot 100 and went to number one on the Dance Club Songs chart.

Background
Lead vocalist Jack Hues said,

Music videos
Two different music videos were made to promote the single. The first version of the video, directed by Derek Jarman, is a collection of home movies with the majority of the archive footage consisting of a stage show with swimmers and fountains, and other World War II-era material. Apparently, the footage is courtesy of the director's father, who was one of the first people to use a colour home movie camera. The toddler in the home movie footage is the director himself as a child. The home movies are interspersed amid footage of Jack, Nick, and Darren, lip-synching and playing the violin. The band are also dressed up as characters from The Wizard of Oz (1900) at the end of the video, with Jack Hues as the Tin Man, Nick Feldman as the Scarecrow, and Darren Costin as the Lion.

The second version of the video is the most well-known, and received heavy rotation airplay at MTV. It is a magical fantasy concept video set in the 1940s, the heyday of dance halls. The video begins in black and white, with Jack Hues stopping in front of a closed-down hall, setting down the suitcase he carries, and picking up a flyer. The scene shifts to colour, featuring the band performing in the packed hall with the backing of a big band as couples dance (played by heavily made-up children from a local dancing school). Later, a disco ball descends to the floor and breaks open, allowing a mirror-covered dancer to emerge. The video ends in black and white, with Hues walking past the hall and down the street; he leaves his suitcase behind, but it sprouts legs and hurries off after him.

This version was nominated for Best New Artist at the 1984 MTV Video Music Awards, losing to "Sweet Dreams (Are Made of This)" by Eurythmics.

Track listing

Charts

Weekly charts

Year-end charts

See also
 List of number-one dance singles of 1984 (U.S.)

References

External links
 

1982 songs
1982 singles
1984 singles
Geffen Records singles
Wang Chung (band) songs
Songs written by Jack Hues
Song recordings produced by Ross Cullum
Song recordings produced by Chris Hughes (record producer)
Songs about dancing